Casmaria, is a genus of medium-sized sea snails, marine gastropod molluscs in the subfamily Phaliinae of the family Cassidae, the helmet shells and their allies.

Species
Species within the genus Casmaria include:
 Casmaria atlantica Clench, 1944
 Casmaria beui Buijse, Dekker & Verbinnen, 2013
 Casmaria boblehmani Fedosov, Olivera, Watkins & Barkalova, 2014
 Casmaria cernica (G. B. Sowerby III, 1888)
 Casmaria erinaceus (Linnaeus, 1758)
 Casmaria kalosmodix (Melvill, 1883)
 Casmaria kayae Buijse, Dekker & Verbinnen, 2013
 Casmaria natalensis Aiken & Seccombe, 2019
 Casmaria perryi (Iredale, 1912)
 Casmaria ponderosa (Gmelin, 1791)
 Casmaria turgida (Reeve, 1848)
 Casmaria unicolor (Pallary, 1926)

 Species brought into synonymy
 Casmaria decipiens Kilburn, R.N., 1980: synonym of Phalium decipiens Kilburn, 1980
 Casmaria erinacea: synonym of Casmaria erinaceus (Linnaeus, 1758)
 Cascara vibexmexicana (Stearns, 1894) : synonym of Casmaria erinaceus (Linnaeus, 1758)

References

 Savigny, J-.C., 1817 Description de l'Egypte, ou recueil des observations et des recherches qui ont été faites en Egypte pendant l'expédition de l'Armée française, publié par les ordres de sa Majesté l'Empereur Napoléon le Grand. Histoire Naturelle, p. 339 pp
 Harasewych, M.G. (1997). The life and malacological contributions of R. Tucker Abbott (1919-1995). The Nautilus 110 (2): 55-77
 Buijse J.A., Dekker H. & Verbinnen G. (2013) On the identity of Casmaria species (Gastropoda, Cassidae), with descriptions of two new species. Acta Conchyliorum 14: 3-93
 Verbinnen G., Segers L., Swinnen F., Kreipl K. & Monsecour D. (2016). Cassidae. An amazing family of seashells. Harxheim: ConchBooks. 251 pp.

External links
 Adams H. & Adams A. (1853-1858). The genera of Recent Mollusca; arranged according to their organization. London, van Voorst. Vol. 1: xl + 484 pp.; vol. 2: 661 pp.; vol. 3: 138 pls

Cassidae
Gastropod genera